Bhutan competed at the 2020 Summer Olympics in Tokyo. Originally scheduled to take place from 24 July to 9 August 2020, the Games were postponed to 23 July to 8 August 2021, because of the COVID-19 pandemic. It is the nation's tenth consecutive appearance at the Summer Olympics. After Karma's loss at the archery event, Bhutan's campaign ended on 28 July 2021.

Competitors
The following is the list of number of competitors in the Games.

Archery

One Bhutanese archer (Karma) directly qualified for the women's individual recurve at the Games by reaching the semifinal stage and obtaining one of the three available spots at the 2019 Asian Championships in Bangkok, Thailand. This marks the first time that a Bhutanese athlete to get an Olympic quota spot in any sport.

Judo

Bhutan entered one male judoka into the Olympic tournament after International Judo Federation awarded them a tripartite invitation quota. This signified the country’s Olympic debut in the sport.

Competing in the men's –60 kg event, Ngawang Namgyel lost to Mihraç Akkuş through a juji-gatame. Despite the loss, the Bhutan Judo Association described Namgyel's performance as "good positive judo" noting that the judoka attempted a seoi nage on his Turkish opponent. Namgyel's loss was attributed to the lack of left-handed senior judoka in Bhutan to spar with during training, as well as newaza or ground training not being a significant part of Namgyel's preparations.

Shooting

Bhutan received an invitation from the Tripartite Commission to send a women's rifle shooter to the Olympics, as long as the minimum qualifying score (MQS) was fulfilled by June 5, 2021.

Qualification Legend: Q = Qualify for the next round; q = Qualify for the bronze medal (shotgun)

Swimming

Bhutan received a universality invitation from FINA to send a male top-ranked swimmer in his respective individual events to the Olympics, based on the FINA Points System of June 28, 2021, heralding the country’s Olympic debut in the sport.

References

Nations at the 2020 Summer Olympics
2020
2021 in Bhutanese sport